Saporiti is a surname. Notable people with the surname include:

Cayetano Saporiti (1887–1954), Uruguayan footballer
Rinaldo Saporiti (1840–1913), Italian painter
Roberto Saporiti (born 1939), Argentine footballer
Teresa Saporiti (1763–1869), Italian operatic soprano and composer
Vincenzo Saporiti (1606–1664), Italian Roman Catholic prelate

See also
Palazzo Saporiti